Paraguay–Russia relations are foreign relations between Paraguay and Russia. Both countries established diplomatic relations on May 14, 1992.  Paraguay has an embassy in Moscow, which is concurrently accredited to Armenia, Azerbaijan, Belarus, Kazakhstan, Tajikistan and Uzbekistan. Russia has an embassy in Asunción.

Russian Federation relations 
Paraguay and the Russian Federation established diplomatic relations on 14 May 1992. Russia has an embassy in Asunción, and Paraguay has a mission in Moscow.

On 13 September 2007, Russia's foreign minister, Sergei Lavrov visited Paraguay and announced that Russia would open an embassy in Asunción.

See also 
 Foreign relations of Paraguay
 Foreign relations of Russia

References

External links 
  Documents on the Paraguay-Russia relationship from the Russian Ministry of Foreign Affairs
  Embassy of Paraguay in Moscow

Bilateral relations of Russia
Russia